Anna Jones is a food writer, stylist, and author, based in London. In 2004, Jones joined Jamie Oliver's Fifteen apprentice programme, working for him for seven years. She then went on to become a published author, and a regular columnist for The Guardian. She is known for focusing on vegetables and vegetarian cookery. She has appeared on television for Saturday Kitchen and Living on the Veg.

Books 

 A Modern Way to Eat, HarperCollins, 2014
 A Modern Way to Cook, HarperCollins, 2015
 The Modern Cook's Year, HarperCollins, 2017
 One: Pot, Pan, Planet, HarperCollins, 2021

Awards 

 Observer Food Monthly Cookery Book of the Year, for The Modern Cook's Year, 2018 
 Cookery Book of the Year, Guild of Food Writers, for The Modern Cook's Year, 2018

References

External links 
 Official website
 Anna Jones, Guardian profile
 Anna Jones, HarperCollins

Year of birth missing (living people)
Living people
British food writers
21st-century British journalists
The Guardian journalists